Lady Saso is said to be the mother of Hyeokgeose of Silla. Also known as the Sacred Mother of Mt. Seondo (Hangul:선도산), legends say she was a princess from the Chinese royal family. Having coming from China and settling upon the Jinhan Confederacy, she gave birth to Hyeokgeose of Silla. Later, she was honored as great king (queen regnant) by King Gyeongmyeong. 

Nonetheless, Korean historians have long questioned her origins noting the case of Kim Bu-sik, the Goryeo bureaucrat whom authored the Samguk Sagi, having been clueless about these "tales and rumors" as he puts it. The Chinese guide Wang Fu (Traditional Chinese: 王黼) of the Song dynasty explained to Kim Bu-sik who saw the statue of a woman in Wuxingwan (Traditional Chinese: 佑神館) as someone who was "the goddess of your country who was a daughter of an old Chinese Emperor that fled East after being suspected of being pregnant without her husband." Kim Bu-sik thought these descriptions strange enough he nor the Korean people back then ever heard of such tales. There is also criticism that these tales are no different from old deifications related to Sinocentrism, claiming false Chinese or unidentified individuals as supposed ancestors as the practice were frequent back then. On the other hand, under the pretext that she is in fact a long lost Chinese princess, some suspect her to be from either one of the dynasties during the Warring State Period; Qin, Yan, and Wei being likely candidates. Others presume she was the princess of the Qin Dynasty due to the passage in the Book of Jin quoting, "Qin(秦)'s old immigrants fled to Jinhan to avoid harsh labor."

When Il-yeon built Samguk yusa in the future, he wrote a legendary addition to the story of Lady Saso, paying attention to Kim Bu-sik's story.

Outline 
The following description is from the Samguk Yusa (Memorabilia of the three Kingdoms), volume 5, clause 7.

Criticism 
This is presumed to be the propaganda of Chinese Sinocentrism, such as the claim that Japan was descended from Xu Fu(徐福), who went to save the elixir(不老草) under Qin Shi Huang(秦始皇)'s direction. The Xiongnu was descended from Lü-Gui(履癸王), the last king of Xia(夏). Western Xia claims they are descendants of ancient Xia. And that the case of Gojoseon(朝鮮) and Gouwu(句吳). Absorbing through this kind of propaganda has long been China's way.

According to Samguk Yusa, they are called Gye-Nong (Hangul:계농), Gye-Rim (Hangul:계림), Baek-Ma (Hangul:백마). 
However, the first mention of "Gye-Rim (Hangul:계림), Gye (Hangul:계)" is mentioned for the first time in the Kim Al-ji legend. Not in Hyeokgeose legend.
It's an error by the Chinese historian who lacked an understanding of early Korean history.

Family

Notes

References 

Silla people
Korean people of Chinese descent
Korean folk religion
Mountain goddesses